Arop Yor Ayik (1935 – June 1999) was a South Sudanese academic and politician.

Early life
He was born in Palo, Doleib Hill, Upper Nile State, South Sudan. He attended primary school at the American Mission at Doleib Hill and was baptized in 1948. From 1949 to 1952, he attended Atar Intermediate School and from 1953 to 1958 attended Rumbek Government Secondary School in Southern Sudan. (Note: all Southern schools were closed down in 1955 due to the first civil war in Torit (South Sudan) in August 1955 which meant loss of one year for all students).

He subsequently attended the University of Khartoum in Sudan from 1958 to 1962, studying English, special Arabic, Economics, History and Philosophy and graduating with B.A. in special Arabic and Philosophy.

In 1986, he was awarded M.A. in TAFL (teaching Arabic as a foreign language) from the American University in Cairo, Egypt.

Career

Administrative and academic positions
 Tutor in Arabic Department, Faculty of Arts, University of Khartoum (1962-64)
 Assistant Warden of Students, University of Khartoum (1964-66) and (1969-80)
 Academic Registrar, University of Khartoum (1974)
 Dean of Students, University of Juba (1982-83)
 Center Coordinator, School of Extra-Mural Studies, University of Khartoum (1986 until death)

Political positions
 Minister of Works, Sudan Central Government (1966-67)
 M.P. and Deputy Speaker of National Parliament in Khartoum (1974-77)
 Minister of Education, Southern Council (1988-89)
 Chairman of National committee for the education of Southern Pupils and Students (1989-90)

Positions in Southern Sudan
 Director of Education (1970-72)
 Director of Information (1972-74)
 Commissioner for Census (1981-82)

Other assignments
 Chairman of the Shilluk Oversight Committee (1989 until death)
 Member of the Arabic Academy of the Sudan (1993 until death)
 Ruling elder in the Presbyterian Church in the Sudan (1990 until death)

Personal life
Arop Yor Ayik was married. He had four daughters and two sons, all university graduates.

Death
Arop Yor Ayik died in the Netherlands in 1999. He was buried in the Sudan in June 1999. 

1999 deaths
1935 births
University of Khartoum alumni
Academic staff of the University of Khartoum
Academic staff of the University of Juba